Gymnelia flavicapilla is a moth of the subfamily Arctiinae. It was described by Rothschild in 1931. It is found in Venezuela.

References

 Natural History Museum Lepidoptera generic names catalog

Gymnelia
Moths described in 1931